King of Conflict is the debut album by British rock band The Virginmarys, released on 4 February 2013 on Cooking Vinyl records in Europe; and 12 February 2013 on Wind Up Records in North America.

Track listing

Personnel
The Virginmarys
 Ally Dickaty – lead and backing vocals, guitar
Danny Dolan – drums, percussion
Matt Rose – bass guitar, backing vocals

Technical staff 
 Toby Jepson – producer
 Chris Sheldon – mixing

References

2013 debut albums
The Virginmarys albums